Phurlijharan is a perennial waterfall in Bhawanipatna, Kalahandi district, Odisha, India. The falls are 16 m high and are known for their multicolored rainbow created on the scattered water because of the reflection of sunlight. It is a tourist attraction for picnics. The falls are close to the Karlapat Wildlife Sanctuary.

Tourism 
Odisha State Road Transport Corporation and private buses connect it with Bhawanipatna and other nearby cities.

Gallery

See also 
 Bhawanipatna
 Geography of Odisha

References 

Kalahandi district
Waterfalls of Odisha